32226 Vikulgupta, provisional designation , is a stony Flora asteroid from the inner regions of the asteroid belt, approximately 3.5 kilometers in diameter.

The asteroid was discovered on 23 July 2000, by the LINEAR team at Lincoln Laboratory's Experimental Test Site near Socorro, New Mexico, in the United States. It was named for Vikul Gupta, a 2016 Intel STS awardee.

Orbit and classification 

Vikulgupta is a member of the Flora family, one of the largest groups of stony asteroids in the main-belt. It orbits the Sun in the inner main-belt at a distance of 2.1–2.6 AU once every 3 years and 7 months (1,295 days). Its orbit has an eccentricity of 0.11 and an inclination of 4° with respect to the ecliptic.

A first precovery was taken at Whipple Observatory in 1997, extending the asteroid's observation arc by 3 years prior to its official discovery observation at Socorro.

Physical characteristics

Rotation period 

In February 2013, two rotational lightcurves of Vikulgupta were obtained from photometric observations at the Palomar Transient Factory in California.

Diameter and albedo 

According to the survey carried out by the NEOWISE mission of NASA's space-based Wide-field Infrared Survey Explorer, Vikulgupta measures 3.8 kilometers in diameter and its surface has an albedo of 0.215, while the Collaborative Asteroid Lightcurve Link assumes an albedo of 0.24 – derived from 8 Flora, the largest member and namesake of its orbital family – and calculates a diameter of 3.1 kilometers with an absolute magnitude of 14.7.

Naming 

This minor planet was named after Vikul Gupta (born 1998), a science competition finalist in the 2016 Intel Science Talent Search, who was awarded for his computer science project. At the time, he attended the U.S. Oregon Episcopal School in Portland. The approved naming citation was published by the Minor Planet Center on 21 May 2016.

References

External links 
 Asteroid Lightcurve Database (LCDB), query form (info )
 Dictionary of Minor Planet Names, Google books
 Asteroids and comets rotation curves, CdR – Observatoire de Genève, Raoul Behrend
 Discovery Circumstances: Numbered Minor Planets (30001)-(35000) – Minor Planet Center
 
 

 

032226
032226
Named minor planets
20000723